Stephan Schreck (born 15 July 1978 in Erfurt) is a German former professional road cyclist, who rode for  and . He was unable to find a new team after  folded, and subsequently decided to retire.

Career highlights

Major results

1996
 1st  Overall Tour de Lorraine
 1st  Overall Grand Prix Rüebliland
1999
 1st Rund um den Henninger Turm U23
 1st Thüringen Rundfahrt der U23
 3rd Overall Triptyque des Monts et Châteaux
2001
 9th Overall Sachsen-Tour
2002
 1st Stage 5 Hessen Rundfahrt
2004
 2nd Overall Regio-Tour
1st Stage 1
 3rd Overall Niedersachsen-Rundfahrt
 4th Overall Sachsen-Tour
1st Stage 1
2005
 10th Rund um die Hainleite
2006
 6th Overall Sachsen-Tour
 9th Rund um Köln
2007
 1st Stage 5 Sachsen-Tour
2008
 6th Overall Sachsen-Tour

Grand Tour general classification results timeline

References

1978 births
Living people
German male cyclists
Sportspeople from Erfurt
People from Bezirk Erfurt
Cyclists from Thuringia
21st-century German people